The canton of Laruns is a former canton located in the arrondissement of Oloron-Sainte-Marie, in the département of Pyrénées-Atlantiques, in the Aquitaine région of France. It was disbanded following the French canton reorganisation which came into effect in March 2015. It consisted of 8 communes, which joined the canton of Oloron-Sainte-Marie-2 in 2015.

Communes
The communes of the canton of Laruns were: 
 Aste-Béon 
 Béost 
 Bielle 
 Bilhères 
 Eaux-Bonnes 
 Gère-Bélesten 
 Laruns 
 Louvie-Soubiron

References

Former cantons of Pyrénées-Atlantiques
2015 disestablishments in France
States and territories disestablished in 2015